Leya, ang Pinakamagandang Babae sa Ilalim ng Lupa (International title: Leya, the Most Beautiful Numbali /  Girl Underneath the Land) is a Philippine television drama fantasy series broadcast by GMA Network. Directed by Ruel S. Bayani, it stars Nadine Samonte in the title role and Oyo Boy Sotto. It premiered on October 18, 2004 replacing Ikaw sa Puso Ko. The series concluded on January 28, 2005 with a total of 75 episodes. It was replaced by Saang Sulok ng Langit in its timeslot.

Cast and characters

Lead cast
 Nadine Samonte as Leya
 Oyo Boy Sotto as Emman

Supporting cast
 Bing Loyzaga as Rosario
 Amy Perez as Maruba
 Jake Roxas as Gilbert
 Jennifer Sevilla as Lorinda
 Kier Legaspi as Eladio
 Lindsay Custodio as Fajita
 Jordan Herrera as Bardok
 Jenine Desiderio as Bararak
 Denise Laurel as Kathleen
 Abigael Arazo as Bumbum

Recurring cast
 Jan Marini as Delia
 Maybelyn dela Cruz as Gamela
 Lester Llansang as Aries
 Dyan Delfin as Lantaya
 Gemmalyn Estrada as Chinggay
 Bon Vivar as Hari

References

External links
 

2004 Philippine television series debuts
2005 Philippine television series endings
Fantasy television series
Filipino-language television shows
GMA Network drama series
Television series by TAPE Inc.
Television shows set in the Philippines